The Joe Hirsch Turf Classic Stakes is a Grade I American Weight for Age Thoroughbred horse race for three years old and older over a distance of  miles on the turf track scheduled annually in late September or early October at Belmont Park in Elmont, New York. The event currently offers a purse of $500,000.

History

The inaugural running of the event was on 19 November 1977 as the Aqueduct Turf Classic Stakes and was won by Johnny D., ridden by 17-year-old Steve Cauthen by  lengths in a time of 2:33. The event was scheduled two weeks after the Washington D.C. International, an event that Johnny D. won as well earning him US Champion Male Turf Horse honors for 1977. The following year the event was held at Belmont Park. In 1979 the event was classified Grade I and was returned to Aqueduct and was held there until 1983. 

In 1983 the name of the event was shortened to being called just the Turf Classic. The event drew the top Thoroughbreds from the U.S. and Europe when it was part of a million dollar bonus for any horse who won it plus the Canadian International Stakes at Woodbine Racetrack in Toronto and the Washington D.C. International at Laurel Park Racecourse in Laurel, Maryland. That year the champion French bred filly All Along was able to win the treble, winning the million dollar bonus and being crowned US Champion Female Turf Horse and US Horse of the Year. 

Other notable champions to win the event in the pre-Breeders' Cup era include the French bred mare, winner in 1978, Waya, who was crowned the US Champion Older Female Horse the following year. The Irish bred filly April Run won the event twice in 1981 and 1982. In 1982 she also won the Washington D.C. International and was voted as US Champion Female Turf Horse. John Henry remarkably won this event in 1984 as a nine year old and what would be his second last start. He was crowned the US Horse of the Year that year.

Early in the Breeders' Cup era the event immediately become one of the major preparatory races for the Breeders' Cup Turf. The 1986 winner the three-year-old Manila and 1987 winner the Irish bred Theatrical, both won the Breeders' Cup Turf and were voted US Champion Male Turf Horse. In 1994 Tikkanen also won the Turf Classic-Breeders' Cup Turf double enroute to US Champion Male Turf Horse.  

In 2004 the event was renamed is named in honor of Joe Hirsch, the award-winning racing columnist and founding president of the National Turf Writers Association.  Joe Hirsch, aged 80, died on January 9, 2009.

Dual winner English Channel was a Breeders' Cup Turf winner in 2007 and also the sire of Channel Maker, a dual winner (2018, 2020) and second placed finisher in 2019 of this event.

In 2022 the event was moved to Aqueduct Racetrack due to infield tunnel and redevelopment work at Belmont Park. The 2022 winner was English Channel's daughter War Like Goddess, with his offspring successful in the event for the third time.

Records
Time record: 
 2:23.39 – Big Blue Kitten (2015)

Margins:
 lengths – Grand Couturier (GB) (2008)

Most wins:
 2 – April Run (IRE) (1981, 1982)
 2 –  Val's Prince  (1997, 1999) 
 2 – English Channel (2006, 2007)
 2 – Channel Maker (2018, 2020) 

Most wins by an owner:
 4 – Bertram & Diana M. Firestone (1981, 1982, 1987, 2010)

Most wins by a jockey:
 5 – John R. Velazquez (1995, 2004, 2006, 2007, 2012)

Most wins by a trainer:
 5 – William I. Mott (1987, 2005, 2018, 2020, 2022)

Winners

Legend:

 

Notes:

§ Ran as an entry

ƒ Filly or Mare

See also 
 List of American and Canadian Graded races
 Joe Hirsch Turf Classic Invitational Handicap top three finishers and starters

References

Open middle distance horse races
Grade 1 turf stakes races in the United States
Grade 1 stakes races in the United States
Horse races in New York (state)
Graded stakes races in the United States
Belmont Park
Recurring sporting events established in 1977
1977 establishments in New York (state)